RAD or Rad may refer to:

People
 Robert Anthony Rad Dougall (born 1951), South African former racing driver
 Rad Hourani, Canadian fashion designer and artist
 Nickname of Leonardus Rad Kortenhorst (1886–1963), Dutch politician
 Radley Rad Martinez (born 1978), American retired mixed martial artist
 "Rad", nickname of Sydney Valpy Radley-Walters (1920–2015), Canadian Army officer, top western Allied tank ace of the Second World War
 Rad Radford, a ring name of American former professional wrestler Louis Mucciolo Jr. (1971–1998)
 Jahon Rad (born 2001), American soccer player, twin brother of Kaveh Rad
 Jovana Rad (born 1987), Serbian basketball player
 Kaveh Rad (born 2001), American soccer player, twin brother of Jahon Rad
 Taras Rad (born 1999), Ukrainian Paralympic cross-country skier and biathlete

Arts and entertainment
 Rad (film), a 1986 release about a young BMX rider
 Rad (comics), a villain in AC Comics's "Femforce"
 Rad Spencer, protagonist of the Bionic Commando video game series
 Bradley "Rad" White, a character in the Transformers Unicron Trilogy, voiced by Kirby Morrow
 Rad (My-Otome), a fictional manga character
 Rad (video game), a roguelike video game

Acronym

 RAD Game Tools, a video game development tools provider
 Radiation assessment detector, a scientific instrument on board the Curiosity rover
 Rapid application development, of software
 Rational Application Developer, an IBM IDE
 Reactive attachment disorder, an emotional disorder
 Reflex anal dilation, a controversial diagnostic technique
 Allegheny Regional Asset District, Pennsylvania, United States
 Reich Labour Service (Reichsarbeitsdienst; RAD), a major World War II German organization
 Relative abundance distribution, a measure of biodiversity
 Rental Assistance Demonstration, an American federal public housing program
 Researchers Alliance for Development, a World Bank multidisciplinary network of researchers
 Restriction site associated DNA markers, a genetic mapping technique
 Rezvani Automotive Designs, American performance car manufacturer
 Right axis deviation, a heart condition
 Robot Alchemic Drive, a video game
 Royal Academy of Dance, UK
 Royal Association for Deaf people, British charity
 Rules for Archival Description, the Canadian archival descriptive standard

Other uses
 Rad (unit), a unit of absorbed radiation dose, largely used in the United States
 Rád, a village in Pest county, Hungary
 Rad (village), in Trebišov District, Slovakia
 RAD Data Communications, a manufacturer of communications access solutions
 Rad Aviation, a defunct British microlight aircraft manufacturer
 Rad (journal), the oldest publication of the Croatian Academy of Sciences and Arts
 Rad (rune) (ᚱ), a rune of the Anglo-Saxon fuþorc and continuation of the Elder Fuþark raido
 rad, symbol for radian, a unit of angle
 Radical of an integer, the mathematical operator, denoted rad(n)
 Radnorshire, historic county in Wales, Chapman code
 FK Rad, a Serbian football club
 Rite Aid, New York Stock Exchange stock symbol RAD
 Radley railway station, England; National Rail station code RAD
 .rad scene-description file format, for Radiance (software)
 Short for radiator, a heating device

See also
 Gerhard von Rad (1901–1971), German Old Testament scholar, Lutheran theologian, exegete and professor
 rad. (disambiguation)
 Rads (disambiguation)

Lists of people by nickname